Lamont Herbert Dozier (June 16, 1941 – August 8, 2022) was an American singer, songwriter, and record producer from Detroit, Michigan. He co-wrote and produced 14 US Billboard number-one hits and four number ones in the UK.

Career
Dozier was a member of Holland–Dozier–Holland, the songwriting and production team responsible for much of the Motown sound and numerous hit records by artists such as Martha and the Vandellas, The Supremes, The Four Tops, and The Isley Brothers. Along with Brian Holland, Dozier served as the team's musical arranger and producer, while Eddie Holland concentrated mainly on lyrics and vocal production.

Along with the Holland Brothers, Dozier followed his work for Motown Records as founder and owner of Invictus Records and Hot Wax Records, producing top-charting hits for acts Freda Payne, Honey Cone, Chairmen of the Board, and 100 Proof Aged in Soul.

Early years
Dozier recorded a few unsuccessful records for various Detroit labels before the trio started working together as a writing and production team for Motown in 1962. They first made their mark the following year with Martha and The Vandellas' early hits, including "Come and Get These Memories" (number 6 R&B), "Heatwave" (number 1 R&B, number 4 pop), and "Quicksand" (number 8 pop).

In 1964, "Where Did Our Love Go" became the first of ten number 1 pop hits which Holland–Dozier–Holland would write and produce for the Supremes over the next three years or so. After Holland–Dozier–Holland left Motown in 1968 to form the Invictus and Hot Wax labels, Dozier began recording as an artist on their labels. The most successful song was "Why Can't We Be Lovers" (number 9 Billboard R&B). Dozier departed from Holland–Dozier–Holland in 1973, and was replaced by new arranger-producer Harold Beatty.

Performer
Dozier went on to record a number of albums as a performer in his own right, also writing much of the material. The 1977 album, Peddlin' Music on the Side (Warner Bros. Records) contained "Going Back to My Roots", which was later recorded by Odyssey. The earlier Black Bach (ABC Records) featured the single "Fish Ain't Bitin (#4 R&B, No. 26 pop).

He had his biggest hit with 1974's "Trying to Hold on to My Woman" (ABC), which reached No. 15 on the pop chart and No. 4 on the R&B chart. For the second season of the TV sitcom That's My Mama (ABC, 1975), Dozier wrote and sang the theme song, replacing the first season's instrumental only theme music. In 1981, he scored a beach music hit with "Cool Me Out" and also in that year released the single "Shout About It" from his LP Lamont. This track had considerable airplay on UK soul radio stations as well as being promoted by UK DJ Robbie Vincent in the early 1980s to a British audience.

Composer
Dozier had another number-one hit as a songwriter in the 1980s, joining with Phil Collins to write the song "Two Hearts" for the movie soundtrack for Buster. "Two Hearts" received a Golden Globe Award for Best Original Song, tying with "Let the River Run" from Working Girl by Carly Simon; an Academy Award nomination for Best Original Song; and a Grammy Award for Best Song Written Specifically for a Motion Picture or Television. Collins and Dozier also co-wrote "Loco in Acapulco" for The Four Tops, which is also featured on the Buster Soundtrack.

In 1984, Essex, England-born singer Alison Moyet scored a U.S. top-40 hit with the Dozier-penned "Invisible". Three years later, Dozier cowrote "Infidelity" and "Suffer" with Simply Red frontman Mick Hucknall for the British pop-soul band's second album, Men and Women. In 1989, they teamed again to write "You've Got It" and "Turn It Up" for Simply Red's follow-up LP, A New Flame.

In 1987, Lamont Dozier composed alone a song for the soundtrack of another film: the song "Without You", which was recorded as a duet by the R&B singers Peabo Bryson and Regina Belle, to be the love theme from the comedy film Leonard Part 6, released the same year. The song was released as a single and entered the United States and United Kingdom music charts, peaked at No. 8 on the Adult Contemporary Tracks, No. 14 on the R&B chart, No. 85 on the UK Singles, and No. 89 on the Billboard Hot 100 (1987–88). "Without You" was also recorded for the Peabo Bryson album Positive, released in 1988.

"Without You" also received two adaptations: the first was in Portuguese and the second was in Spanish, in 1989 and 1990, respectively. Both adaptations received the title "Amor Dividido" and were recorded by the Brazilian singer Rosana; The Spanish version of "Amor Dividido" was performed as a duet by Rosanah Fienngo (known mononymously as Rosana) with the Mexican singer Emmanuel.

Awards and honors
Dozier and the Holland brothers were inducted into the Rock and Roll Hall of Fame in 1990.

In 2009, he worked on the music for the musical stage version of the 1996 movie The First Wives Club. He also taught credit courses on popular music as an Artist-in-Residence Professor on the faculty at the University of Southern California Thornton School of Music in 2008.

Personal life and death
Dozier was married three times. His first two marriages, to Elizabeth Ann Brown and to Daphne Dumas, both ended in divorce. His third marriage, to Barbara Ullman, lasted from 1980 until her death in 2021. They had three children and he had three children from his first marriage.

Dozier died at his home near Scottsdale, Arizona, on August 8, 2022, at the age of 81.

Discography

Albums

Singles
As a member of The Romeos
 "Gone, Gone, Get Away" (1957); Fox 749
 "Moments to Remember You By" (1957); Fox 846

As a member of The Voice Masters:
 "Hope and Pray" (1959); Anna 101
 "Needed" (1959); Anna 102
 "In Love in Vain" (1960); Frisco 15235

As a member of Ty Hunter and The Voice Masters:
 "Orphan Boy" (1960); Anna 1114
 "Free" (1960); Anna 1123

As La Mont Anthony:
 "Popeye (The Sailor Man)" (1961) withdrawn, and replaced by "Benny the Skinny Man" (same backing track, new vocal); Anna 1125
 "Benny the Skinny Man" (1961); Anna 1125
 "Just to Be Loved" / "I Didn't Know (What a Good Thing I Had)" (1961); Checkmate 1001

As Lamont Dozier and a member of Holland-Dozier (Lamont Dozier and Brian Holland):

As composer
1984: "Invisible" – Alison Moyet
1987: "Without You" – Peabo Bryson and Regina Belle
1988: "Hold On to Love" – Jon Anderson
1989: "Two Hearts" – Phil Collins
1989: "Amor Dividido (Without You)" (Portuguese) – Rosana
1990: "Amor Dividido (Without You)" (Spanish) – Rosana and Emmanuel
1990: "Anything Is Possible" – Debbie Gibson
2004: "Spoiled" – Joss Stone

References

External links
 Official website 
 Oral History, Lamont Dozier shares moments of his life story and career. Interview date June 20, 2012, NAMM (National Association of Music Merchants) Oral History Library
 
 

1941 births
2022 deaths
Musicians from Detroit
Songwriters from Michigan
Record producers from Michigan
Motown artists
Golden Globe Award-winning musicians
Grammy Award winners
African-American songwriters
21st-century African-American musicians
20th-century African-American musicians